Doni Saagali  is a 1998 Indian Kannada-language drama film directed by Rajendra Singh Babu. The storyline is based on the novel Vimukthe by Dr. C. N. Muktha.  The film stars Soundarya and Shashikumar.

The film was released in 1998 and met with critical appraisals. The film went to win Karnataka State Awards in 3 categories : Best Third film, best actress for Soundarya and best cinematographer for D. V. Rajaram. The film's soundtrack and score were composed by V. Manohar who also wrote the songs. The film was dubbed in Telugu as Mahila.

Cast
 Shashikumar
 Soundarya
 Girish Shetty
 Siddharth
 Suman Nagarkar
 Mynavathi
 Shankar Ashwath
 Harish Raj
 Shanthamma
 Tennis Krishna

Soundtrack

Reception
The Hindu wrote "The story follows such a natural course that one can almost predict what is coming next. The lack of tautness in narrative adds to the flab. The film falls flat, lacking the sensitivity needed for a story like this. “Doni Saagali” turns out to be a mushy film like many of its kind with little to differentiate it from the ordinary." 

The Times of India wrote, " Soundarya bas done justice to her role, breathing heart and soul into it. However, in the second half of the movie her acting gains a tinge of ‘histrionics' when she indulges in theatrical acts like screaming in a hospital and doing odd things in a zoo. After a long pause, Shashi Kumar stages a comeback and makes his presence felt as a jilted lover. A good watch, no doubt."

References

External links
 Doni Sagali songs

1990s Kannada-language films
1998 films
Indian drama films
Films based on Indian novels
Films directed by Rajendra Singh Babu
Films scored by V. Manohar